Roskilde Cathedral School is a historic high school in Roskilde, Denmark. It was established around 1020 with close connections to Roskilde Cathedral. The school has since 1969 been located on Holbækvej in the western part of the city while its old main building next to the cathedral now houses Roskilde Gymnasium, another high school.

History

The school was probably established in the early 11th century (c. 1020) in connection with the cathedral. It was initially designed for the education of priests who could serve the cathedral. There are references to pupils at the school from 1074. Around 1080, a building was constructed to the north of the first travertine cathedral known as Kloster for Brødrene (Friars' Cloister) which was no doubt used as a school house. When the brick cathedral was built in the 13th century, a new school building was constructed immediately west of the cathedral.

After the Reformation in 1536, the school was struck by a period of poverty, forcing the pupils to beg in the neighbourhood for food and clothing. The curriculum did not change until the 18th century when it was adapted to include both theology and law, attracting more pupils.

A new building for the school was completed on the cathedral square in 1842 to a design by Jørgen Hansen Koch. With its six classrooms, it was able to accommodate all 70 pupils. Girls were first admitted to the school in 1903 but were initially kept away from the boys. Despite several extensions, by 1969 the building had again become too small. The school moved to its current premises on Holbækvej designed by Preben Hansen.

Today
As of September 2014, the school has 1,352 pupils and a staff of 150, of whom 129 are teachers. The school provides a high level of secondary-school education thanks to its competent staff and a pleasant teaching environment designed to motivate pupils on an individual basis.

Notable alumni

 Absalon (ca. 1128-1201), archbishop, statesman
 Saxo Grammaticus (ca. 1150-1208), historian
 Christian Friis til Borreby (1556–1616), Chancellor of Denmark
 Andreas Brünniche (1704–1769), painter
 Andreas Christian Hviid (1749–1788), linguist and theologian
 Gottsche Hans Olsen (1760–1829), writer, diplomat and theatre director
 Johan Ernst Hartmann (1770–1844), composer
 Severin Claudius Wilken Bindesbøll (1798–1871), bishop and politician
 Jacob Kornerup (1825–1913), archaeologist and painter
 Carl von Nutzhorn (1828–1899), politician and minister of justice
 Ludvig Holstein-Ledreborg (1839–1912), prime minister
 Vilhelm Topsøe (1840–1881), writer and journalist
 Morten Pedersen Porsild (1872–1956), botanist
 Vilhelm Lassen (1861–1908), politician and finance minister
 Asger Ostenfeld (1866–1931), engineer
 Eduard Reventlow (1883–1963), diplomat
 Poul Sørensen (1904–1969), politician
 Aksel Schiøtz (1906–1975), singer
 Ada Bruhn Hoffmeyer (1910-1991) weapons expert
 Elias Bredsdorff (1912–2002), writer and resistance fighter
 Lise Nørgaard (born 1917), writer
 Jytte Hilden (born 1942), politician
 Ib Michael (born 1945), novelist, poet
 Thure Lindhardt (born 1974), actor

References

Literature

External links
 Official website

Gymnasiums in Denmark
Cathedral schools
Education in Roskilde
Buildings and structures in Roskilde Municipality
Educational institutions established in the 11th century
School buildings completed in 1969